Yves-Marie Chiron de la Casinière (11 February 1897 – 26 October 1971) was a French musician, composer and music educator.

Life 
Born in Angers, la Casinière studied with Nadia Boulanger at the École Normale de Musique de Paris and with Max d'Ollone and Georges Caussade at the Conservatoire de Paris. In 1925 he won the first Second Grand Prix de Rome with the cantata La mort d'Adonis. He worked as general inspector of the city of Paris for music lessons.

In addition to his compositions, including symphonic works, instrumental concertos and chamber music, de la Casinière wrote several music pedagogical writings.

La Casinière died in Paris on 26 October 1971.

Works 
 Hercule et les Centaures, symphonic poem, 1920
 Symphonie pour piano et orchestre, 1922
 Béatrix, cantata, 1923
 Les Amants de Vérone, cantata, 1924
 Sonatine for piano and cello, 1924
 La mort d’Adonis, cantata, 1925
 Persée et Andromède, symphonic poem
 Au clair de lune, song (éditions Maurice Sénart) 1926).
 , film score, 1927
 Sonatine for piano and violin, 1941
 Quatuor avec piano, 1942
 Trio avec piano, 1944
 7 Petites pièces très faciles pour clarinette for piano, 1956
 Berceuse for oboe and piano, 1957
 Thème varié for trumpet and piano, 1958
 Concerto for pipe organ and orchestra, 1958
 Études pour piano
 Le Cheval, song

Bibliography 
He published several teaching books on music theory and piano learning studies. 
 La Musique des origines A nos jours, Éditions Larousse, Paris 1946, 
 Initiation à la lecture et à la dictée de la musique, 1958
 25 minutes de travail pianistique et du disque, 1958
 La technique du clavier par l'image, méthode de piano, 1958
 La lecture musicale, série d'exercices progressifs ou complémentaires avec ou sans accompagnement de piano, 1958

References

External links 
 Yves de la Casinière (Musica et memoria)
 Palmarès Prix de Rome
 Concertino pour scie par Yves de la Casinière
 Film scores by Yves de la Casinière
 Yves de la Casinière (Encyclopedia.com)

1897 births
People from Angers
1971 deaths
20th-century French composers
French classical composers
French male classical composers
Conservatoire de Paris alumni
École Normale de Musique de Paris alumni
Prix de Rome for composition
20th-century French male musicians